Gadjiwan (also Gayivao, Gājiwáu, Gayivayo, Gayioau, Gajiwau, Gadjwan Gadjiwa) is a village in the commune of Mayo-Baléo in the Adamawa Region of Cameroon, near the .

Population 
In 1971, Gadjiwan contained 394 inhabitants, mainly Kutin

At the time of the 2005 census, there were 1681 people in the village of Gadjiwan and 3571 in the canton.

References

Bibliography
 Jean Boutrais (ed.), Peuples et cultures de l'Adamaoua (Cameroun) : Actes du colloque de Ngaoundéré, du 14 au 16 janvier 1992, ORSTOM, Paris ; Ngaoundéré-Anthropos, 1993, 316 p. 
 Dictionnaire des villages de l'Adamaoua, ONAREST, Yaoundé, October 1974, 133 p.

External links
 Mayo-Baléo, on the website Communes et villes unies du Cameroun (CVUC)
 Centre de santé intégré de Gadjiwan

Populated places in Adamawa Region